Events from the year 1649 in Ireland.

Incumbent
Monarch: Charles I (until 30 January), monarchy abolished.

Events
 30 January  
 King Charles I of England, Scotland and Ireland is beheaded in London.
 Prince Charles Stuart declares himself King Charles II of England, Scotland and Ireland. At the time all three Kingdoms had not recognised him as ruler.
 22 May–October – Robert Blake blockades Prince Rupert's fleet in Kinsale.
 2 August – Battle of Rathmines – a combined Irish Confederate and English Royalist force trying to besiege Dublin is routed by the English Parliamentarians with heavy casualties.
 15 August – Oliver Cromwell lands in Dublin with the New Model Army to begin the Cromwellian conquest of Ireland.
 3 September – Siege of Drogheda begins.
 11 September – Sack of Drogheda: Cromwell takes the town and put its Irish Catholic Confederation garrison to death.
 2 October – siege of Wexford begins.
 11 October – Sack of Wexford: Cromwell's forces take and sack the town, killing many of its defenders and several hundred civilians.
 19 October – New Ross falls to the English Parliamentarian forces.
 November (early) – Battle of Arklow: An Irish force attacks Cromwell's army as it marches south but is beaten off.
 19 November – Carrick-on-Suir taken by stealth by Cromwellian forces after they discover an undefended gate. An Irish counter-attack under Major Geoghegan on 24 November is repulsed with five hundred Irish Confederate soldiers killed.
 November 24 – Cromwell's army arrives before Waterford to besiege the city.
 6 December – Battle of Lisnagarvey – a Scottish Covenanter force is routed by the English Parliamentarian New Model Army.
 10 December – Cromwell calls off the siege of Waterford and retires to Youghal: due to bad weather and disease, only 3,000 of his 6,500 besieging force are still fit for duty.

Births

Deaths
 11 September – Arthur Aston, Royalist commander (killed during the sack of Drogheda), (b. 1590)
 6 November – Owen Roe O'Neill Irish Catholic general (dies of disease), (b. 1590)
 December – Michael Jones, English Parliamentarian general (dies of disease at the siege of Waterford).

References